Hsu Ya-ching (born 30 July 1991) is a Taiwanese badminton player.

Personal life 
Hsu is married to former doubles partner Lin Chia-yu.

Career 
She started playing badminton at aged 10, then in 2009 she joined Chinese Taipei national badminton team. She participated in the 2015 Malaysia Super Series Premier Qualification, in the 2015 Japan Super Series and in the 2014 Chinese Taipei Open Grand Prix Gold.

Achievements

Summer Universiade 
Women's doubles

Mixed doubles

World University Championships 
Mixed doubles

BWF World Tour (1 title, 2 runners-up) 
The BWF World Tour, which was announced on 19 March 2017 and implemented in 2018, is a series of elite badminton tournaments sanctioned by the Badminton World Federation (BWF). The BWF World Tour is divided into levels of World Tour Finals, Super 1000, Super 750, Super 500, Super 300 (part of the HSBC World Tour), and the BWF Tour Super 100.

Women's doubles

Mixed doubles

BWF Grand Prix (1 runner-up) 
The BWF Grand Prix had two levels, the Grand Prix and Grand Prix Gold. It was a series of badminton tournaments sanctioned by the Badminton World Federation (BWF) and played between 2007 and 2017.

Women's singles

BWF International Challenge/Series (4 titles, 3 runners-up) 
Women's singles

Women's doubles

Mixed doubles

  BWF International Challenge tournament
  BWF International Series tournament
  BWF Future Series tournament

References

External links 

 

Living people
1991 births
Sportspeople from Tainan
Taiwanese female badminton players
Badminton players at the 2018 Asian Games
Asian Games competitors for Chinese Taipei
Universiade gold medalists for Chinese Taipei
Universiade bronze medalists for Chinese Taipei
Universiade medalists in badminton
Medalists at the 2015 Summer Universiade
Medalists at the 2017 Summer Universiade
21st-century Taiwanese women